Oğul is a village in the central district of Hakkâri Province in Turkey. The village is populated by Kurds of the Geravî and Jirkî tribes and had a population of 155 in 2022.

The eight hamlets of Ağaçsız, Dilek, Göze, Ilıca, Kavak, Yayık and Yeşiltaş are attached to Oğul.

History 
The village of Oğul was originally a Nestorian village until Sayfo in 1915 and was subsequently unpopulated until a Kurd from the Jirkî tribe arrived to the village from Beytüşşebap in the second half of the 1930s. More Kurds subsequently settled in the village.

Population 
Population history from 2000 to 2022:

References 

Villages in Hakkâri District
Kurdish settlements in Hakkâri Province
Historic Assyrian communities in Turkey